The forty-first edition of the Caribbean Series (Serie del Caribe) was held from February 2 through February 8 of  with the champion baseball teams of the Dominican Republic, Tigres del Licey; Mexico, Águilas de Mexicali; Puerto Rico, Indios de Mayagüez, and Venezuela, Cardenales de Lara. The format consisted of 12 games, each team facing the other teams twice, and the games were played at Hiram Bithorn Stadium in San Juan, Puerto Rico.

Summary

Semifinales 

Venezuela              5
Dominicañ Repubile     3
México                 11
Puerto Rico            1 

Final 
México           4
Venezuela        5

Final standings

Semifinals 
Dominican Republic vs Venezuela 

           1 2 3 4 5 6 7 8 9        R  C  H
Tigres     0 2 0 3 0 0 0 5 0        5  2  3
Cardenles  0 0 0 0 0 1 0 0 x        1  3  2

Mexico vs. Puerto Pico 
            1 2 3 4 5 6 7 8 9 10    R C H
Aguilas     0 1 0 2 0 0 0 0 0 5     5 1 2
Indios      0 1 0 2 0 0 0 0 0 2     2 4 3 

 Final 
July 23, 1999     7:50
Dominican Republic vs Mexico 
         1 2 3 4 5 6 7 8 9
Tigres   0 1 0 2 0 0 0 0 4
Aguilas  0 1 0 2 0 0 2 0 X 
Tigres win 4:2

Individual leaders

All-Star team

Sources
Bjarkman, Peter. Diamonds around the Globe: The Encyclopedia of International Baseball. Greenwood. 
Serie del Caribe : History, Records and Statistics (Spanish)
Resumen de la Serie del Caribe 1999 (Spanish)
Tigres del Licey : Una mirada histórica a la Serie del Caribe (Spanish)

Caribbean
1999
International baseball competitions hosted by Puerto Rico
1999 in Puerto Rican sports
1999 in Caribbean sport
Caribbean Series